is a Japanese politician served as the Speaker of the House of Representatives of Japan from 2015 to 2021. A member of the Liberal Democratic Party, he previously served as the  Minister of Agriculture, Forestry and Fisheries, and the Minister of Education, Culture, Sports, Science and Technology. He is affiliated to the revisionist lobby Nippon Kaigi.

Career

A native of Hachinohe, Aomori and graduate of Keio University, he worked at the national newspaper Mainichi Shimbun from 1970 to 1974, and was elected to the Aomori Prefectural Assembly in 1975. He was elected to the House of Representatives for the first time in 1983 after an unsuccessful run in 1980.

References

External links 
  

|-

|-

|-

|-

|-

|-

|-

|-

|-

|-

1946 births
Living people
People from Hachinohe
Keio University alumni
Members of the House of Representatives (Japan)
Government ministers of Japan
Liberal Democratic Party (Japan) politicians
21st-century Japanese politicians
Members of Nippon Kaigi
Members of the Aomori Prefectural Assembly
Speakers of the House of Representatives (Japan)